Franco Paonessa is a retired Italian-American professional soccer player who has played in the second and third American Soccer Leagues, United Soccer League, American Indoor Soccer Association and USISL.

Paonessa was a junior college All American soccer player at Fulton–Montgomery Community College.
In 1982, he signed with the Rochester Flash of the second American Soccer League where he earned Rookie of the Year honors.  In 1984, he played for the New York Nationals of the United Soccer League.  In 1987, Paonessa joined the Albany Capitals as they played an independent schedule.  In 1988, the Capitals joined the third American Soccer League.  In 1989, the Capitals did not offer Paonessa a contract and he moved to the New Jersey Eagles.  He also played for the Memphis Storm of the American Indoor Soccer League In December 1990, the New York Kick of the National Professional Soccer League signed Paonessa who had been painting houses.  He remained with the Kick through the 1990-1991 season.  He then played for the Greek American AA of the Cosmopolitan Soccer League.  In the fall of 1992, he signed with the Canton Invaders of the NPSL.  He then played for the New Jersey Stallions of the USISL.  Paonessa has continued to play amateur soccer with U.S. Parma.

International

Paonessa competed for the Puerto Rico national football team during Puerto Rico's qualification games for the 1994 FIFA World Cup.

Yearly Awards
1982 ASL Rookie of the Year

References

1959 births
Living people
Association football midfielders
Albany Capitals players
American Indoor Soccer Association players
American Soccer League (1933–1983) players
American Soccer League (1988–89) players
Canton Invaders players
Greek American AA players
Italian emigrants to the United States
Memphis Storm players
National Professional Soccer League (1984–2001) players
New Jersey Eagles players
New Jersey Stallions players
New York Kick players
New York Nationals (USL) players
Rochester Flash players
United Soccer League (1984–85) players
USISL players
Puerto Rican footballers
Puerto Rico international footballers
Junior college men's soccer players in the United States